John McEnroe was the defending champion.

McEnroe successfully defended his title, defeating Gene Mayer 6–7, 6–3, 6–3 in the final.

Seeds

  John McEnroe (champion)
  Harold Solomon (quarterfinals)
  Peter Fleming (quarterfinals)
  Gene Mayer (final)
  Wojtek Fibak (semifinals)
  Tim Gullikson (quarterfinals)
  Brian Gottfried (semifinals, retired)
  Stan Smith (second round)
 N/A
  Yannick Noah (first round)
 N/A
 N/A
  Tomáš Šmíd (third round)
  Marty Riessen (second round)
  Vijay Amritraj (third round)
  Hank Pfister (third round)

Draw

Finals

Top half

Section 1

Section 2

Bottom half

Section 3

Section 4

External links
 Main draw

Stockholm Open
1979 Grand Prix (tennis)